Fontainebleau is a suburb of Johannesburg, South Africa. It is located in Region 3.

History
Named after the famous French palace called Fontainebleau by the surveyor of the suburb called W.H. Auret Pritchard after a visit to France.

References

Johannesburg Region B